Jon Ottar Hustad (born 25 March 1968) is a Norwegian journalist, writer and lector in history.

Hustad was born in Bondalen, Ørsta. He currently (2009) works in Dag og Tid. He worked for Klassekampen from 2002 to 2003 and 2004 to 2007, and Morgenbladet from 2003 to 2004. His non-fiction books include Skolen som forsvann (2002), Hjørundfjorden (2005) and Varsleren (2006). He has a cand.philol. degree from 1997.

Bibliography
Hustad has written several non-fiction books:

 Skolen som forsvann (2002)
 14 menn og ei kvinne (2004)
 Hjørundfjorden (2005)
 Varsleren (2006)
 Gjeldsslaven Europa (2012)

References

1968 births
Living people
Norwegian journalists
Norwegian non-fiction writers